EnRoute: John Scofield Trio LIVE is an album by the John Scofield Trio featuring bass guitarist Steve Swallow and drummer Bill Stewart that was recorded at the Blue Note Jazz Club in New York City in December 2003.

Tracks
"Wee" (Denzil Best) – 8:24
"Toogs" (Scofield) – 7:26
"Name That Tune" (Swallow) – 6:30
"Hammock Soliloquy" (Scofield) – 9:50
"Bag" (Scofield) – 9:03
"It Is Written" (Scofield) – 6:39
"Alfie" (Burt Bacharach, Hal David) – 6:52
"Travel John" (Scofield) – 7:30
"Over Big Top" (Scofield) – 11:15

Personnel
 John Scofield – electric guitar
 Steve Swallow – bass guitar
 Bill Stewart – drums

References 

2004 live albums
Live post-bop albums
John Scofield live albums
Verve Records live albums